Edward Kernan Campbell (April 17, 1858 – December 7, 1938) was chief judge of the Court of Claims.

Education and career

Born on April 17, 1858, in Abingdon, Virginia, Campbell attended the University of Virginia and Emory and Henry College. He entered private practice in Abingdon from 1883 to 1884. He continued private practice in Birmingham, Alabama from 1884 to 1913.

Federal judicial service

Campbell was nominated by President Woodrow Wilson on May 1, 1913, to the Chief Justice seat on the Court of Claims (later the United States Court of Claims) vacated by Chief Justice Stanton J. Peelle. He was confirmed by the United States Senate on May 22, 1913, and received his commission the same day. He assumed senior status on April 22, 1928. His service terminated on December 7, 1938, due to his death in Washington, D.C.

Other service

Campbell served as a special master for the United States District Court for the Southern District of New York in 1931.

References

Sources
 

1858 births
1938 deaths
Judges of the United States Court of Claims
United States Article I federal judges appointed by Woodrow Wilson
20th-century American judges